The 1984 Lorraine Open was a men's tennis tournament played on indoor carpet courts. The event was part of the 1984 Volvo Grand Prix. It was the sixth edition of the tournament and was played in Metz in France from 12 March through 18 March 1984. Unseeded Ramesh Krishnan won the singles title.

Finals

Singles
 Ramesh Krishnan defeated  Jan Gunnarsson 6–3, 6–3
 It was Krishnan's 1st singles title of the year and the 3rd of his career.

Doubles
 Eddie Edwards /  Danie Visser defeated  Wayne Hampson /  Wally Masur 3–6, 6–4, 6–2

References

External links
 ITF tournament edition details

Lorraine Open
Lorraine Open
Lorraine Open
Lorraine Open